Vis-à-vis may refer to:

 Vis-à-vis, a French expression in English, literally "face to face (with)", meaning in comparison with or in relation to
 Vis-à-vis (album), by Karol Mikloš, 2002
 Vis-à-vis (carriage), a type of horse-drawn carriage
 Vis a vis (TV series), a Spanish TV series
 "Vis à Vis" (Star Trek: Voyager), an episode of the TV series

See also
 Viz (disambiguation)